Edwin John Davidson (12 February 1899 – 1 April 1958) was the 4th bishop of Gippsland from 1955  until his death in 1958.

Educated at the University of Sydney, he was ordained in 1926.  From then until 1930 he was a Toc H Chaplain. Later he was a Residentiary Canon firstly at Bathurst and later (until his elevation to the episcopate) Rector of St James' Church, Sydney (1938-55).

Notes

1899 births
University of Sydney alumni
Anglican bishops of Gippsland
1958 deaths
20th-century Anglican bishops in Australia